Denmark competed at the 2008 Summer Paralympics in Beijing.

Medalists

Athletics

Men's track

Men's field

Cycling

Men's road

Women's road

Equestrian

Individual events

Team

* - denotes individual score counted towards total score.

Goalball

Men's team
The men's team didn't win any medals, they were 6th out of 12 teams.
Players
Mads Brix Baulund
Jonas Elkjær
Kenneth Hansen
Ricky Nielsen
Martin Enggaard Pedersen
Peter Weichel

Tournament

Quarterfinals

5-8th classification

5/6th classification

Women's team
The women's team won the bronze medal after defeating Sweden.
Players
Karina Jørgensen
Maria Larsen
Mette Præstegaard Nissen
Kamilla Bradt Ryding
Ninna Marie Thomsen 
Lykke Vedsted

Tournament

Semifinals

Bronze medal match

Rowing

Sailing

Shooting

Men

Women

Swimming

Men

Women

Table tennis

Wheelchair tennis

Men

See also 
2008 Summer Paralympics
Denmark at the Paralympics
Denmark at the 2008 Summer Olympics

External links
Beijing 2008 Paralympic Games Official Site
International Paralympic Committee

References

Nations at the 2008 Summer Paralympics
2008
Paralympics